Convent of Santo Domingo may refer to:
 Santo Domingo Convent, a convent in Argentina
 Convento de Santo Domingo, Cartagena, a convent in Colombia
 Convent of Santo Domingo, Cusco, a convent in Peru
 Basilica and Convent of Santo Domingo, a convent in Lima, Peru
 Convent of Santo Domingo (Girona) or Convent de Sant Domènec de Girona, a convent in Spain
 Convent of Santo Domingo (Valencia), a convent in Spain